Holan, Holaň, Holán, or Holáň (Czech feminine: -ová) is a surname. It may refer to:

Holan
 Angie Drobnic Holan, American journalist
 Ariel Holan (born 1960), Argentine football manager
 Jaromír Holan (born 1941) Czech ice dancer
 Jerry Holan (born 1931), American swimmer
 Martina Holan (born 1976), Canadian soccer player
 Miloš Holaň (born 1971), Czech ice hockey player
 Regina Holan, American football player
 Václav Karel Holan Rovenský (1644–1718), Czech composer
 Vilém Holáň (born 1938), Czech politician
 Vladimír Holan (1905–1980), Czech poet

Holanova
 Dana Holanová, Czech ice dancer
 Kateřina Holánová (born 1977), Czech actress

See also
 
 

Czech-language surnames